Koudelka (feminine: Koudelková) is a Czech surname. Notable people include:

 Drahomír Koudelka (1946–1992), Czech volleyball player
 Jan Koudelka (born 1992), Czech footballer
 Joan Koudelka (born 1948), South African tennis player
 Josef Koudelka (born 1938), Czech photographer
 Joseph Maria Koudelka (1852–1921), American Roman Catholic bishop
 Ken Koudelka, American musician
 Martin Koudelka (born 1976), Czech ice hockey player
 Roman Koudelka (born 1989), Czech ski jumper
 Štěpán Koudelka (born 1945), Czech tennis player

See also
 
 Kudelka

Czech-language surnames